Dan Bell (born February 9, 1977) is a filmmaker from Baltimore, Maryland. He is best known for the Dead Mall documentary series, cataloging the 2010s urban decay phenomenon of foreclosured shopping malls.

Dead Mall

Narrated by Bell, the moments chronicled in what Bryan Menegus of Gizmodo calls a "hypnotizing tour" throughout a "post-capitalist dystopia[n]" landscape of stores and shopping centers that went out of business during the early-to-mid-2010s' so-called "retail apocalypse."<ref>Mall memories remain for a generation of Roanoke Valley mall rats" (2018), The Roanoke Times, Lee Enterprises Inc. Archive (2022)</ref>Sanburn Josh (July 20, 2017). "Why the Death of Malls Is About More Than Shopping," Time, Marc & Lynne Benioff. Retrieved 2022-09-15. Archive (2022) These videos received millions of views. Bell employs salvaged commercials, VHS tapes, retro-futuristic imagery and sound, and audio-visual collages and montages, underlying the uneasy themes. Malls featured in Bell's chronicles most notably include Owings Mills Mall, Bristol Mall, Burlington Center Mall, Marley Station Mall, Voorhees Town Center, Rolling Acres Mall, Frederick Towne Mall, and Staunton Mall. The intros of episodes in the series often use clips of these videos that have been distorted or exaggerated in a surreal effect. Bell personally finds the Rolling Acres Mall episode to be the most unnerving, recalling the eerie image of frogs singing out loud in an abandoned mall: 

Steven Kurutz of The New York Times compared the series with its soothing voice-over and retro-synth vaporwave music to Michael Galinsky's time-capsule photo book Malls Across America'', stating, "they evoke the same fuzzy ’80s nostalgia[,] even as they offer an unsettling visual document of the retail apocalypse that changing consumer habits, e-commerce and economic disparity have wrought." Nostalgia—as noted by some by-gone store owners, viewers, and writer Gillian Flynn,—is also a driving force behind the late 2010s private and public interest in the dead-malls phenomenon because to some people, "[it] was more than just a store. It was part of the community." On the other hand, Bell received some negative reception from shopping mall owners and shareholders, to which he responded, "Malls contact me and are livid they are featured, but the reality is, what are they going to do?"

Work
Filmography

Personal life
Coincidentally, Bell in his later teens held various jobs at shopping mall stores; at a Macy’s, a shoe store, and a leather-goods boutique.

References

1977 births
Living people
People from Baltimore
American documentary filmmakers
Gay men
21st-century American LGBT people